Laufenburg (Baden) Ost station is a railway station in the town of Laufenburg (Baden), Baden-Württemberg, Germany. The station lies on the High Rhine Railway. The train services are operated by Deutsche Bahn.

Services 
 the following services stop at Laufenburg (Baden) Ost:

References

External links
 
 

Railway stations in Baden-Württemberg
Buildings and structures in Waldshut (district)